A list of films released in Japan in 1979 (see 1979 in film).

See also
1979 in Japan
1979 in Japanese television

Footnotes

References

External links
 Japanese films of 1979 at the Internet Movie Database

1979
Japanese
Films